Harri Tapani Kirvesniemi (born 10 May 1958, in Mikkeli) is a Finnish former cross-country skier who competed from 1980 to 2001. During his career he won six Olympic medals (all bronzes), and also the 50 km event at the Holmenkollen ski festival in 2000. He retired after being caught doping at the 2001 World Championship in Lahti.

Career
His biggest successes though were at the FIS Nordic World Ski Championships, where he earned a total of eight medals. This included one gold (15 km: 1989), three silvers (4 × 10 km relay: 1989, 1995. 1997), and four bronzes (15 km: 1982, 30 km: 1985, 4 × 10 km relay: 1982 (shared with East Germany), 1991).
In 1998, he earned the Holmenkollen medal (shared with Fred Børre Lundberg, Larissa Lazutina, and Alexey Prokurorov). He was married to Marja-Liisa Kirvesniemi, who won the Holmenkollen medal in 1989. This makes them the third husband-wife team to ever win the Holmenkollen medal.

During the 2001 FIS Nordic World Ski Championships in Lahti, he tested positive for use of the banned plasma expander Hemohes together with five fellow Finnish cross-country skiers. This resulted in the disqualification of the gold-medal winning Finnish relay team. Following the scandal, Kirvesniemi retired from competitive skiing. In 2013, he received a 6-month suspended sentence after the Helsinki District Court found that he had committed perjury when witnessing to the court in 2011 that he was unaware of any doping use in the 1990s.

Presently Kirvesniemi works as the Plant Manager and Board Member at Yoko Ski.

Cross-country skiing results
All results are sourced from the International Ski Federation (FIS).

Olympic Games
 6 medals – (6 bronze)

World Championships
 8 medals – (1 gold, 3 silver, 4 bronze)

World Cup

Season standings

Individual podiums
 6 victories 
 16 podiums

Team podiums
 7 victories 
 23 podiums 

Note:  Until the 1999 World Championships and the 1994 Olympics, World Championship and Olympic races were included in the World Cup scoring system.

See also
 List of sportspeople sanctioned for doping offences
 List of athletes with the most appearances at Olympic Games
 List of multiple Olympic medalists in one event

References

External links 
 
 
 Holmenkollen medalists – click Holmenkollmedaljen for downloadable pdf file 
 Holmenkollen winners since 1892 – click Vinnere for downloadable pdf file 

1958 births
Living people
People from Mikkeli
Cross-country skiers at the 1980 Winter Olympics
Cross-country skiers at the 1984 Winter Olympics
Cross-country skiers at the 1988 Winter Olympics
Cross-country skiers at the 1992 Winter Olympics
Cross-country skiers at the 1994 Winter Olympics
Cross-country skiers at the 1998 Winter Olympics
Doping cases in cross-country skiing
Finnish male cross-country skiers
Finnish sportspeople in doping cases
Holmenkollen medalists
Holmenkollen Ski Festival winners
Olympic cross-country skiers of Finland
Olympic medalists in cross-country skiing
FIS Nordic World Ski Championships medalists in cross-country skiing
Medalists at the 1998 Winter Olympics
Medalists at the 1984 Winter Olympics
Medalists at the 1980 Winter Olympics
Medalists at the 1992 Winter Olympics
Medalists at the 1994 Winter Olympics
Olympic bronze medalists for Finland
Sportspeople from South Savo